Viedma is the capital and fourth largest city of the Río Negro Province, in northern Patagonia, Argentina. The city has 80,632 inhabitants (2020), and is located on the southern margin of the Negro River, about 30 kilometres off the Atlantic Coast, and 960 km from the city of Buenos Aires on the National Route 3.

History 
Together with the city of Carmen de Patagones across the river in Buenos Aires Province, Viedma is the oldest European settlement in Patagonia, founded by Francisco de Viedma y Narváez under the name of Nuestra Señora del Carmen on 22 April 1779. Originally the two cities were one, called Carmen de Patagones.  The original fort was built on the south side of the river in modern Viedma, but it was destroyed within a few months. A new fort was built on the north side, in modern Carmen de Patagones. This fort lasted much longer, and the tower still stands today. The town grew and eventually expanded back across the river into modern-day Viedma. On 11 October 1878, the town was split, with the Río Negro as their border.

With the Conquest of the Desert, the city became the capital of all Argentine Patagonia and later, when that was further divided into smaller territories, the capital of the Río Negro Territory. In 1880, Alvaro Barros, the first governor of Río Negro, changed the name of the city to Viedma. During severe flooding in 1889, the capital of Río Negro was temporary moved to Choele Choel, but was quickly restored to Viedma.

In 1986, during the presidency of Raúl Alfonsín, a proposal was made to move the federal capital from Buenos Aires to Viedma. This was to reduce congestion in Buenos Aires, to help develop Patagonia, and to promote the development of the interior. A bill to that effect was passed by Congress the following year, but owing to economic problems, the project had stagnated by the end of the Alfonsín administration in 1989.

Economy 
The main economical activities in the area of the Valle Inferior are cattle, as well as some agriculture with onion, maize and alfalfa being the most important. However, Viedma is mainly an administrative city, being the capital city of the province.

Transport 
The Gobernador Castello Airport  serves flights to Buenos Aires, Neuquén, Bariloche, Puerto Madryn, Trelew, Comodoro Rivadavia, Mar del Plata, and other cities in Argentina. It is located 6 km from the city, and has an average annual traffic of 30,000 passengers.
30 km downstream from Viedma, on the Atlantic shore, the El Cóndor beach resort town  (Balneario Massini) is the most visited tourist beach in the area. The Servicios Ferroviarios Patagónico connect with San Carlos de Bariloche.

Climate 
Viedma has a cool semi-arid climate (Köppen climate classification BSk). The nearby South Atlantic Ocean and the Viedma river moderate the climate.

The city is windy throughout the entire year. Generally, the windiest period is from October to February while March to June are the least windy. The cause of this is attributed to the effects produced by the convergence of distinct wind currents originating from the general atmospheric circulation from both the South Atlantic High and the South Pacific High. Being located in a transitional area between the South Atlantic High and the South Pacific High, this geographic location is responsible for the variability in wind speeds throughout the year. Occasionally, strong gusts exceeding  can occur.

During this time of the year, overcast days are more common, averaging 9–10 days per month although sunny days are fairly common as well. Spring and fall are transition seasons featuring warm daytime temperatures and cool nighttime temperatures and are highly variable with some days reaching above  and below . The diurnal range (difference between average high and average low) is large along with the temperature profile of Viedma makes it appropriate for the development of wide variety of subtropical crops. During the hottest days in summer when the wind is from the northwest or west, sea breezes can occur that can move inland in the opposite of the mentioned wind directions which moderate summer temperatures. This occurs because when the surrounding land heats faster than the sea, causing the land to have lower atmospheric pressure than the sea which has a relatively higher atmospheric pressure. As a result, the pressure difference causes the sea breeze to move inland to the lower pressure area. In contrast, during night, the reverse occurs as the land cools faster than the surrounding sea. Frosts that occur in winter are usually of short duration and are not intense. The average date of the first frost occurs on April 8 and the last frost occurs on November 21 and there are 210 frost free days in an average year.

Relative humidity is low, averaging 62%, with the summer months being drier than the winter months. Nonetheless, it is common to have high humidity conditions, particularly during early morning and late evening when temperatures are lower.  On average, Viedma receives  of precipitation per year which is evenly distributed throughout the year. During spring and summer, precipitation occurs irregularly and there is a water deficit, owing to higher temperatures and windier conditions that promote evapotranspiration and drier conditions. In winter and autumn, precipitation occurs regularly resulting in less water deficit owing to lower temperatures, more moderate winds, and higher humidity (lower evapotranspiration). On average, there are 73 days with measurable precipitation. Summers tend to have less rainy days than winter due to rainfall occurring more intensely (shorter bursts).

Viedma receives 2620 hours of sunshine per year or 57.7% of possible sunshine per year, ranging from a low of 43.5% in July to a high of 69% in March. This makes Viedma relatively sunny relative to the average in the country.

See also 
 Buenos Aires Great Southern Railway
 Ferrocarril General Roca
 Servicios Ferroviarios Patagónico

References

External links

Welcome Viedma (English)
Viedma and around (Spanish)
Clasificados Viedma (Spanish)
Viedma Portal (Spanish)
Viedma Accommodation Portal (English)

Populated places established in 1779
Capitals of Argentine provinces
Populated places in Río Negro Province
Cities in Argentina
Argentina
Río Negro Province